Erik Hans Bennett (born September 13, 1968) is a retired professional baseball player who played two seasons for the California Angels and Minnesota Twins of Major League Baseball.  He is currently the pitching coach for the Salt Lake Bees.

A native of Yreka, California, Bennett attended Yreka High School and Cal State Sacramento. In 1988, he played collegiate summer baseball with the Brewster Whitecaps of the Cape Cod Baseball League. He was selected by the Angels in the 4th round of the 1989 MLB Draft.

See also
 List of second generation MLB players

References

External links

1968 births
Living people
People from Yreka, California
Baseball players from California
American expatriate baseball players in Canada
Major League Baseball pitchers
Sacramento State Hornets baseball players
Brewster Whitecaps players
California Angels players
Minnesota Twins players
Bend Bucks players
Quad Cities Angels players
Palm Springs Angels players
Quad Cities River Bandits players
Midland Angels players
Vancouver Canadians players
Tucson Toros players
Salt Lake Buzz players
Akron Aeros players
Bend Bandits players
Tri-City Posse players
Chico Heat players
Minor league baseball coaches
Baseball coaches from California